Post 70s Generation is a literary critical term in Chinese contemporary literature, which refers to the new generation of writers who were born after 1970 in China. In some criticism these writers have also been described as the 'Post Cultural Revolution Generation', or 'Post Maoism Generation' as they grew up after Mao's death.

Background
This concept firstly appeared in Shanghai's literary magazine 'Fiction World'(小说界) in 1996, as a column for young writers born after 1970 (whom were still in early 20s at that time), and then it was widely used in literary criticism from 1990s to early 21st century in China, until the 'Post 80s Generation' emerged soon after.

The well known Post 70s writers include Mian Mian, Wei Hui, Zhou Jieru, Yilin Zhong, Shen Haobo (poet), Ding Tian, Wang Ai, Wei Wei, Dai Lai, Li Shijiang (poet), Jin Renshun, Zhu Wenying, Wu Ang (poet), Yin Lichuan (poet), Sheng Keyi, Ma Yi, Zhao bo, Jia Zhangke (film maker), Xiaolu Guo (film maker), and Xie Youshun (literary critic), etc.

The iconic groups of Post 70s Generation include: 1, Beauty writers (refers to women writers only), 2, Lower body poets (refers to a poem style), and 3, The 6th Generation (refers to film makers).

Beauty writers
There was a famous event in 2000 while the 'Beauty writers' had become a popular concept in Chinese media. When Wei Hui published her novel 'Shanghai Baby' in 1999, one of her very good friends, Shanghai born writer Mian Mian released an essay with title 'Wei Hui has not plagiarized my work', saying that she was shocked that Wei Hui's fiction plagiarized her work and she even called her to ask about this, then Wei Hui answered her: 'I didn't copy your words one by one.(我没有拿着你的小说一个字一个字地抄。)'

This caused a massive argument between Wei Hui and Mian Mian, and then later other post 70 generation writers Zhou Jieru, Yilin Zhong, and Wei wei, etc., were involved into this incident too (regarding whether Wei plagiarized Mian or not). Afterword, this controversy was totally overwhelmed by all newspapers' reports based on each side's different views and arguments, ‘beauty writers' debate' led millions of comments online by mass people, and in public it was like a mass media's carnival. Rapidly this scandal became  and consequently pushed Wei Hui's book 'Shanghai Baby' to be a bestseller in China (later internationally bestseller).

However, since the debate affected a large area and at the later stage, the Chinese media fell into chaos and were out of control, soon later the Chinese government banned 'Shanghai Baby' due to its pornographic plot. This China's official action had become a free propaganda to western media and therefore pushed this book further to be translated worldwide and became an international bestseller.

Then due to the ban in China, the concept of 'Beauty writers' faded soon after this.

Lower Body Poets
While the iconic figures of 'Post 80s Generation' are 'Guo Jingming' and 'Han Han', both are commercial popular writers and both became Forbes multi-millionaires and have millions of fans in Chinese youth, in 2006, there was a famous debate between the 'Post 70s Generation' iconic figure, the minor group 'Lower Body' poet Shen Haobo and Han Han, the latter who claimed that 'both modern poets and poems are no longer in need of existence, and the genre of modern poetry is meaningless'(现代诗歌和诗人都没有存在的必要，现代诗这种体裁也是没有意义的). This raised anger from Lower body poets. Shen Haobo wrote in his blog: 'The genuine novelists can never sell more than Han Han's rubbish work. This is the best writers and poets' own choice, and nothing to complain. However, Han Hans would still hate these all.' (真正的小说家们永远卖不过韩寒的文字垃圾。这是优秀的作家和诗人的自我选择，没什么可抱怨的。但是，韩寒们仍然会仇视这一切）Shen haobo said he wouldn't talk about human's sense to a donkey(对一头驴就不用讲人的道理) so there is nothing to talk about. Then he fought back with an impromptu writing poem: 'A Donkey/ is a donkey/ is very donkey donkey/ and if you ask/ why he is so donkey/ it's because/ he is a/ donkey for show/...and it's because/ he is a/ donkey with fans.' (驴/很驴/非常驴.../你问他/为什么这么驴/那是因为/他是一头/有粉丝的驴)

This story illustrates some of the differences between those two generations.

The 6th Generation
Jia Zhangke was born in 1970 and has become an iconic post 70s film director in China. His recent film 'A Touch of Sin' won the 66th Cannes International Film Festival Award for Best Original Screenplay, however for some political reason, this Chinese film has released in many oversea countries but China. Jia said this really disappointed him and he even once thought of giving up his film-making career.

References

 
Cultural generations
Chinese literature
Literary genres